The Rajabai Tower is a clock tower in South Mumbai India. It is in the confines of the Fort campus of the University of Mumbai. It stands at a height of 85 m (280 ft or 25 storeys). The tower is part of The Victorian and Art Deco Ensemble of Mumbai, which was added to the list of World Heritage Sites in 2018.

History
The Rajabai Clock Tower was designed by Sir George Gilbert Scott, an English architect. He modeled it on Big Ben in London.The foundation stone was laid on 1 March 1869 and construction was completed in November 1878. The total cost of construction came to ₹555000, a large amount of money for the time period. A portion of the total cost of construction was donated by Premchand Roychand, a wealthy broker who founded the Bombay Stock Exchange on the condition that the tower be named after his mother Rajabai.

Premchand Roychand's mother was blind and as a staunch follower of Jain religion, she was supposed to consume her dinner before the evening. Legend says that the evening bell of the tower helped her to know the time without anyone's help.

The tower was closed to the public after it became a frequent spot for those attempting to commit suicide.

Structure
The tower was built in a fusion of Venetian and Gothic styles. It is built out of the locally available buff coloured Kurla stone. The tower has one of the best stained glass windows in the city.

During its time, it was the tallest structure in the city of Mumbai.

Chimes

During the 19th century it played the tunes of "Home! Sweet Home!" and "A Handel Symphony", out of a total of sixteen tunes, which changed four times a day. It currently chimes only one tune every 15 minutes.

Restoration
From October 2013 to 11 May 2015, the tower underwent restoration work under the observation of Anita Garware (Heritage Society), Dr. Rajan Welukar (Vice-Chancellor; University of Mumbai) and N Chandrasekar (CEO, Tata Consultancy Services).It reopened in March 2015 after renovation

The restoration efforts were recognised by UNESCO in 2018 when the Library and the Rajabai Clock Tower received the UNESCO Asia-Pacific Award for Cultural Heritage Conservation.

References

External links
Rajabai Tower

Towers completed in 1878
Clock towers in India
The Victorian and Art Deco Ensemble of Mumbai
Gothic Revival architecture in India
Clock towers